Villa di Tirano is a comune (municipality) in the Province of Sondrio in the Italian region Lombardy, located about  northeast of Milan and about  east of Sondrio, on the border with Switzerland.

The municipality of Villa di Tirano contains the frazioni (subdivisions, mainly villages and hamlets) Motta and Stazzona.

Villa di Tirano borders the following municipalities: Aprica, Bianzone, Brusio (Switzerland), Corteno Golgi, Teglio, Tirano.

Demographic evolution

References

Cities and towns in Lombardy